The India national wheelchair handball team is the national wheelchair handball team of India and is controlled by the Handball Federation of India.

History
They participated at the first Four a Side World Championship in September 2022. They lost the fifth place game in the penalty shootout against the Netherland. They finished the tournament at the sixth place out of six teams. Two months later at the Six a Side World Championship they lost again a penalty shootout at the third place game against the Norwegian team and they finished fourth out of 9 teams. At this tournament they had 5 new players out of 12. Many of the players of the Six a Side World Championship squad were also wheelchair basketball player. Reena Gupa plays for the India women's national wheelchair basketball team.

Competitive record

Wheelchair Handball World Championship
Besides Netherland they are the only team which participated at the Four a side and Six a Side World Championship in 2022.

References

External links 
 website
 IHF Team Page (2022 Four a Side)

National wheelchair handball teams
Handball in India
Handball